Cher Victor is a 1975 French comedy film directed by Robin Davis. It was entered into the 1975 Cannes Film Festival.

Plot
Victor and Anselme are two aged men who are cohabitants for practical reasons. The widower Victor permanently picks on Anselme who still always remains rather nonchalant. When they try to organise a music festival they are joined by a lady named Anne who considers  herself an accomplished singer. Victor picks at her too and unlike Anselme she cannot take it.  Seeing that Anselme has had it and starts to hit back.

Cast
 Bernard Blier as Anselme
 Jacques Dufilho as Victor Lasalle
 Alida Valli as Anne
 Jacqueline Doyen as Micheline
 Alice Reichen as Jeanne
 Philippe Castelli as the nephew
 Jacques Rispal as Charret

References

External links

1975 films
1970s French-language films
1975 comedy films
Films directed by Robin Davis
French comedy films
1970s French films